Sold may refer to:

 Sold (Boy George album), 1987
 Sold (Died Pretty album), 1996
 Sold (TV series), a British comedy drama television series
 Sold (McCormick novel), a 2006 novel by Patricia McCormick and Illustrated by Bryn Barnard
 Sold (Gullifer novel), a 2009 novel by Brendan Gullifer
 Sold (1915 film), an American silent film directed by Edwin S. Porter
 Sold (2014 film), a narrative feature film directed by Jeffrey D. Brown
 Sold (2022 film), Indian film
 "Sold (The Grundy County Auction Incident)", a 1995 song by John Michael Montgomery
 "Sold!", an episode of season 9 of SpongeBob SquarePants